The This House Is Not for Sale Tour was a concert tour by American rock band Bon Jovi in support of their album This House Is Not for Sale. The tour marked the first time of Phil X and Hugh McDonald as official members of the band.

Background
During an interview on The Ellen DeGeneres Show on October 5, 2016, Jon Bon Jovi officially announced that band would embark on tour on February 8, 2017 with a concert in Bon Secours Wellness Arena in Greenville. Ticket presales began on October 10, 2016 and everyone who purchased a ticket received a physical copy of the album This House Is Not for Sale (2016) at the time of its release.

Rehearsals for "This House Is Not for Sale" were done in Connecticut and band rehearsed around 90 songs for the tour. Tico Torres explained: "It looks like we're doing a lot more stuff in the round to have some people around us as well, which I think we always loved ... to have actual fans behind you as you're playing, and it's quite simple and it's movable," he said. "There's a lot of motion that goes with the songs. We're rehearsing it now and trying to get used to it. When you're onstage, you see it a little differently than when you're in the audience". This is the first Bon Jovi tour that marks bassist Hugh McDonald and guitarist Phil X as official band members. John Shanks, band's producer, joined on guitar along with Everett Bradley on percussion.

On February 25, 2017, during the performance of the song "I Got the Girl", Jon Bon Jovi's daughter, Stephanie, came on stage and they both danced to that song. The show in the Pepsi Center in Denver on March 14, 2017 was rescheduled to April 14, 2017 due to scheduling conflicts. On March 18, 2017, the day Chuck Berry died, Bon Jovi paid tribute to him by playing Johnny B. Goode. On March 31, 2017, there was rain during the concert in Philadelphia and the next day Jon Bon Jovi got a cold. During the performance on April 5, 2017, in Pittsburgh, Jon was still battling a sore throat because of the cold, but he insisted that the band played the concert that night. Right before the performance of the song Born to Be My Baby, Jon told the audience that he can't sing anymore and called out a fan to sing the song instead of him. After that, the band finished the show with an audience sing-along on Livin' on a Prayer. After the concert, Jon Bon Jovi's brother, Matthew Bongiovi and many fans praised Jon's effort and working ethic via Twitter. Jon was diagnosed with a bronchitis and based on his doctor's recommendations, the band rescheduled their shows in Madison Square Garden for April 7 and April 8, 2017 to April 13 and April 15, 2017.

Opening Act Contest
The band held a contest to choose opening acts for the tour's first North America leg. Artists uploaded videos of themselves performing their own music and concert promoter Live Nation selected ten finalists. Bon Jovi management then picked winners from the finalists to perform twenty-minute sets. Winners of the first round were Michael Tracy for the concert in Grenville on February 8, Maradeen for the concert in Atlanta on February 10, Yardij for the concert in Sunrise on February 12, Hannah Jae for the concert in Tampa on February 14, Sweet Tea Trio for the concert in Birmingham on February 16, Jake Johnson for the concert in Nashville on February 18 and The Former Me for the concert in St. Louis on February 19, 2017. Winners of the second round were Taddy Porter for the concert in Oklahoma City on February 21, Blacktop Mojo for the concert in Dallas on February 23, Daring Greatly for the concert in Las Vegas on February 25, Natalie Gelman for the concert in Sacramento on February 28, 2017.

Winners of the third round were Thadeus Gonzales for the concert in San Jose on March 1, Luxxe for the concert in Phoenix on March 4, De La Torre for the concert in San Diego on March 5, Stellar Revival for the concert in Inglewood on March 8, 2017. Winners of the fourth round were Cusses for the concert in Memphis on March 16, Liberty Deep Down for the concert in Columbus on March 18, The Ohio Weather Band for the concert in Cleveland on March 19, Shiny Penny for the concert in Indianapolis on March 22 and The Patti Fiasco for the concert in Denver on April 14, 2017. Winners of the fifth round were 35th & Taylor for the concert in Chicago on March 26, Step Rockets for the concert in Saint Paul, Iamdynamite for the concert in Detroit on March 29, Mach 22 for the concert in Philadelphia on March 31, Analog Heart for the concert in Uncasville on April 1, 2017. Winners of the sixth round were Interlochen Singer-Songwriters for the concert in Pittsburgh on April 5, Oak & Ash for the concert in New York City on April 7, Dylan Rockoff also for the concert in New York on April 8, Beth Thornton for the concert in Toronto on April 10 and Cannons also for the concert in Toronto on April 11, 2017.

Opening acts

Michael Tracy (February 8, 2017)
Maradeen (February 10, 2017)
Yardij (February 12, 2017)
Hannah Jae (February 14, 2017)
Sweet Tea Trio (February 16, 2017)
Jake Johnson (February 18, 2017)
The Former Me (February 19, 2017)
Taddy Porter (February 21, 2017)
Blacktop Mojo (February 23, 2017)
Daring Greatly (February 25, 2017)
Natalie Gelman (February 28, 2017)
Thadeus Gonzalez (March 1, 2017)
Luxxe (March 4, 2017)
De La Torre (March 5, 2017)
Stellar Revival (March 8, 2017)
Cusses (March 16, 2017)
Liberty Deep Down (March 18, 2017)
The Ohio Weather Band (March 19, 2017)
Shiny Penny (March 22, 2017)
35th & Taylor (March 26, 2017)
Step Rockets (March 27, 2017)
Iamdynamite (March 29, 2017)
Mach22 (March 31, 2017)
Analog Heart (April 1, 2017)
Interlochen Singer-Songwriters (April 5, 2017)
Beth Thornton (April 10, 2017)
Cannons (April 11, 2017)
Oak & Ash (April 13, 2017)
Dylan Rockoff (April 15, 2017)
Temple Agents (September 14, 2017)
Airbag (September 16, 2017)
The Patti Fiasco (March 14, 2018)
Hold On Hollywood (March 23, 2018)
Tempt (May 10, 2018)
Goodnight, Sunrise (May 12, 2018)

Live recordings
Every show from the North American leg of the tour was recorded and offered as a digital download. Live recordings could be downloaded from band's official store as MP3 files, high resolution FLAC files or could be purchased as an exclusive USB bracelet; USB bracelets were offered on every North American show. All the live recordings were available two to three days after the concerts.

Critical and commercial reception
Donna Isbell Walker from The Greenville News said about first show in Greenville that "In the song [Livin' on a Prayer], Tommy and Gina have each other “and that’s a lot.” Bon Jovi and the audience made it clear that they have each other too, and on Wednesday, it seemed like more than a lot". Melissa Ruggieri from The Atlanta Journal-Constitution said that "While this isn’t Bon Jovi’s flashiest tour, it solidifies their standing as one of rock’s most resilient acts". Jay Cridlin from Tampa Bay Times said about concert in Tampa Bay that "After more than three decades, Bon Jovi still knows how to make a Florida crowd feel special. Only one fan walked away with a Valentine’s Day kiss. But everyone else felt the love." Cindy Watts form The Tennessean said for concert in Bridgestone Arena in Nashville that "there was also a finely-honed, record-setting rock band that proved its music, just like its singer, is ageless". Kevin C. Johnson from St. Louis Post-Dispatch said about concert in St. Louis's Scottrade Center that "Bon Jovi’s not missing a beat; it’s still Bon Jovi as you know it...You know what you’re getting with Bon Jovi. There’s nothing revolutionary here, but it’s the uncomplicated feel of it all that’s so appealing, even to this day". Markos Papadatos from Digital Journal for concert on April 13, 2017. said that "Bon Jovi's live show at Madison Square Garden garnered an A rating". For the same concert, Jay Lustig from Asbury Park Press said that "Bon Jovi’s muscles may ache but he still, at 55, has an athletic, energetic stage presence. His voice may have lost a bit of its power, but the band covers for that effectively by making virtually every chorus a group effort". Chris Jordan, also from Asbury Park Press, said that Bon Jovi "delivered — a Garden party, with memories of the past and eyes on the future."

Bon Jovi broke the attendance record in Nashville's Bridgestone with 18,514 fans attending the concert. The Arena Tour grossed $31.2 million in revenue from North American concerts occurred during the first quarter of 2017. The band sold total of 359,055 tickets from 23 arena performances during a seven-week time period beginning with the February 8th opener through the end of March.

Set list
This set list is from the June 15, 2019, concert in Dublin. It is not intended to represent all concerts for the tour.
 This House Is Not for Sale
 Raise Your Hands
 You Give Love a Bad Name
 Born to Be My Baby
 Whole Lot of Leavin'
 Lost Highway
 Runaway
 We Weren't Born to Follow
 Have a Nice Day
 Keep the Faith
 Amen
 I'll Be There for You
 In These Arms
 It's My Life
 Blood on Blood
 Wanted Dead or Alive
 Lay Your Hands on Me
 Captain Crash & the Beauty Queen from Mars
 Who Says You Can't Go Home
 I'll Sleep When I'm Dead
 Bad Medicine / Shout
Encore:
 These Days
 When We Were Beautiful
 When We Were Us
 Always
 Livin' on a Prayer

Tour dates

Personnel
Bon Jovi 
Jon Bon Jovi – lead vocals, guitar
Phil X – lead guitar, talk box, backing vocals
Hugh McDonald – bass, backing vocals
Tico Torres – drums, percussion
David Bryan – keyboards, backing vocals

Added musicians 
John Shanks – rhythm guitar, backing vocals 
Everett Bradley – percussion, backing vocals

Notes

References

Bon Jovi concert tours
2017 concert tours
2018 concert tours
2019 concert tours